The DRG Class E 16 were German electric locomotives in service with the Bavarian Group Administration of the Deutsche Reichsbahn, and were conceived as motive power for express trains. They were initially designated as the Bavarian Class ES 1, before being incorporated into the DRG numbering plan as E 16.

History
The first series (E16 01-10) was delivered in 1926, the second (E16 11-17) in 1927. The third, re-worked series (E16 18-21) was transferred to the Deutsche Reichsbahn in 1932 and 1933.

Numbers E 16 11 and E 16 13 were lost in the Second World War, E 16 12 was retired in 1967 after an accident. With the introduction of the DB classification system on 1 January 1968, the remaining 18 Class E 16 engines were regrouped into Class 116. Between 1973 and 1980 the engines were gradually withdrawn from service. On 31 January 1980, the last Class 116 locomotive, number 116 009, was finally retired.

Design
One technical feature is the Buchli drive, in which the motors drive the driving wheels on one side only via outside gears; the other side is not driven. As a result, an E 16 has an asymmetric appearance. On one side you can see the Buchli drive, on the other just the bare spoked wheels. The E 16 is the only German locomotive class with Buchli drives.

The Brown, Boveri Cie (BBC) was responsible for the designs.

Preserved locomotives
The following E 16 locomotives have been preserved:
 E 16 03 DB Museum Koblenz-Lützel
 E 16 07 Freilassing Locomotive World in Freilassing
 E 16 08 Darmstadt-Kranichstein Railway Museum
 E 16 09 Augsburg Railway Park

See also
List of DRG locomotives and railbuses
List of Bavarian locomotives and railbuses

Literature

External links 
 E 16 scale model photographs

E 16
Locomotives of Bavaria
Electric locomotives of Germany
15 kV AC locomotives
1′Do1′ locomotives
Brown, Boveri & Cie locomotives
Railway locomotives introduced in 1926
Standard gauge locomotives of Germany
Passenger locomotives